The G-15 or Group of 15 is an informal forum composed of developing countries, set up to foster cooperation and provide input for other international groups.

G15 or G-15 may also refer to:

Politics
 G-15 (Eritrea), a group of politicians in Eritrea
 Group of Democratic Centralism, once called Group of 15, a Russian opposition group

Computing
 Bendix G-15, a computer
 Logitech G15, a computer keyboard
 Samsung Sens G15, a laptop computer

Transportation
 County Route G15, a road in California
 G15 Shenyang–Haikou Expressway, an expressway in China connecting the cities of Shenyang and Haikou
 GER Class G15, a class of British steam locomotive
 Ginetta G15, a car model 
 Matchless G15, a motorcycle model
 Prince G-15 engine used in the Nissan Skyline car model

Other
Canon PowerShot G15, a digital camera
G15 (housing associations), a group of large social landlords in London, UK